The 1968 Icelandic Cup was the ninth edition of the National Football Cup.

It took place between 21 July 1968 and 5 October 1968, with the final played at Melavöllur in Reykjavik. The cup was important, as winners qualified for the UEFA Cup Winners' Cup (if a club won both the league and the cup, the defeated finalists would take their place in the Cup Winners' Cup). Teams from the Úrvalsdeild karla (1st division) did not enter until the quarter finals. In prior rounds, teams from the 2. Deild (2nd division), as well as reserve teams, played in one-legged matches. In case of a draw, lots were drawn. From the semi-finals, after a replay, lots were drawn.

ÍBV Vestmannaeyjar, newly promoted to the 1. Deild won the Icelandic Cup for the first time in their history, and therefore progressed into Europe. Another first came when a reserve team reached the final - KR Reykjavik, who beat their own first team in the quarter final.

Preliminary round

First round 

 Entrance of Haukar Hafnarfjörður, IA Akranes, IB Isafjörður, Breiðablik Kopavogur and the reserve teams of Fram Reykjavik B, Vikingur Reykjavik B, Valur Reykjavik B and ÍBV Vestmannaeyjar B.

Second round 

 Entrance of UMF Selfoss

Third round

Quarter finals 
 Entrance of 6 clubs from 1. Deild

Semi finals

Final 

 ÍBV Vestmannaeyjar won their first Icelandic Cup and qualified for the 1969–70 European Cup Winners' Cup.

See also 

 1968 Úrvalsdeild
 Icelandic Cup

External links 
  1968 Icelandic Cup results at the site of the Icelandic Football Federation

Icelandic Men's Football Cup
Iceland
1968 in Iceland